Hypectopa is a genus of moths in the family Gracillariidae.

Species
Hypectopa ornithograpta Diakonoff, 1955

External links
Global Taxonomic Database of Gracillariidae (Lepidoptera)

Acrocercopinae
Gracillarioidea genera